Facundo Daniel Kruspzky (born 28 July 2002) is an Argentine professional footballer who plays as a midfielder for Arsenal de Sarandí.

Career
Kruspzky is a product of the Arsenal de Sarandí academy. His move into first-team football occurred towards the end of 2020, as the midfielder participated in a number of pre-season friendlies; including against Argentinos Juniors and Boca Juniors. He made his senior debut in a Copa de la Liga Profesional draw away to Unión Santa Fe on 1 November, featuring for the final moments of a match that ended goalless after coming on in place of Nicolás Miracco.

Personal life
Kruspzky's older brother, Lucas, is also a professional footballer.

Career statistics
.

Notes

References

External links

2002 births
Living people
Sportspeople from Avellaneda
Argentine footballers
Association football midfielders
Arsenal de Sarandí footballers
Argentine people of Polish descent